Otto Bertil Anderberg (13 February 1913 – 11 September 1991) was a Swedish film actor. He was born in Malmö, Sweden and died in Gothenburg.

Filmography

References

External links

1913 births
1991 deaths
20th-century Swedish male actors

Actors from Malmö